Mañana (stylized as *Mañana) is a band from Basel, Switzerland. It is a five piece band, with Manuel Bürkli performing the vocals and guitar, Jan Krattiger on guitar, Jenny Jans on piano, Samuel Burri on bass, and Lorenz Hunziker on drums.

History

Mañana was founded by Manuel Bürkli and Jan Krattiger (an acoustic duo) when they were joined by bassist Samuel Burri, pianist Stephan Bader and drummer Lorenz Hunziker. They started performing in venues around Basel in 2003. They were subsequently signed by the label Inside Agency, and soon begun recording some of their songs. They then started opening for bands including I Am Kloot, Keane, Mew and A-ha.

Mañana's first record, Fast Days EP, was released in December 2003 throughout Switzerland. It contained five tracks which the band had recently recorded. The band was then able to gain worldwide exposure with their signature track, "Miss Evening", being featured on the soundtrack of FIFA 2005. The song, which had been getting frequent airplay in Switzerland and around Europe, was heard by hundreds of thousands of people, who would form the basis of their wide and dedicated fan base.

In late 2004, "Miss Evening" was released around Switzerland as Mañana's first single. But to combat the increasing global demands for their music, their Fast Days EP and "Miss Evening" singles were soon released for legal download on iTunes, Sony Connect and Amazon. The CD version of the EP was a hot seller at the Virgin Megastore in New York's Times Square, where staff made a Mañana shelf display.

Feeling that their popularity had grown enough, Mañana embarked on their first ever tour, of Northern Europe in Autumn 2005. This included nine shows in Germany, Austria, The Netherlands and Sweden. They finished the tour with five shows in England, including Liverpool's Cavern Club and headlined the Dublin Castle in London's hipster paradise of Camden Town.

A new album has been in planning since early-2005 under the guidance of Swiss label Coffee, and in August 2007 it was announced that they would begin recording their album, in both Basel and Hamburg. Demos of their new songs Time/Gently and Some Kid have been played on Mañana's MySpace page, however.

In recent times, Mañana has been performing in numerous festivals and events around Switzerland.

Mañana released their debut full album (Interruptions) in August 2008.

Under unknown circumstances, Stephan Bader left the band sometime after the release of Fast days. Jenny Jans currently fills his role.

Musical style and influences 
Mañana play an essential alternative rock, with heavy influences from indie pop and indie rock.

They are influenced by British bands Doves, U2 and The Verve. In more recent times they have looked up to their fellow Swiss band Lovebugs. The band says it is their goal to create "their own style". Despite being from Switzerland, almost all of Mañana's lyrics are in English.

Discography

Albums

Interruptions (2008) 
 Loyalty
 Unbalance
 Make A Tiger
 Broken Solid Side
 Monster
 Red
 Elephant
 Little Lights
 Berliner Blau
 Roadside Museum

EPs

Fast Days (2005) 
 Fast Days
 Miss Evening
 There It Goes
 English Garden
 Funny Faces

Singles 
From Fast Days:
 "Miss Evening" (2005)

From Interruptions:
 "Make A Tiger" (2008)
 "Unbalance" (2009)

References

External links 
 

2002 establishments in Switzerland
Musical groups established in 2002
Swiss alternative rock groups
Swiss indie rock groups